is a train station in Chūō-ku, Niigata, Niigata Prefecture, Japan, operated by East Japan Railway Company (JR East).

Lines

Station layout

The station consists of an island platform serving two tracks, with the station situated above the tracks.

The station has a "Midori no Madoguchi" staffed ticket office. Suica farecard can be used at this station.

Platforms

History 
The station opened on 15 November 1913. With the privatization of Japanese National Railways (JNR) on 1 April 1987, the station came under the control of JR East.

Passenger statistics
In fiscal 2017, the station was used by an average of 1939 passengers daily (boarding passengers only).

Surrounding area
 Niigata Daiichi High School

References

External links

 JR East station information 

Railway stations in Niigata (city)
Railway stations in Japan opened in 1913
Stations of East Japan Railway Company
Echigo Line